Maino was an Italian professional cycling team that existed only in 1965. The team was led by Alfredo Sivocci, who was a professional cyclist in the 1920s.

Riders of the team won four stages of the 1965 Giro d'Italia, including one by Domenico Meldolesi and Danilo Grassi and two by, Raffaele Marcoli. It was sponsored by Italian bicycle and motorcycle manufacturer .

References

Defunct cycling teams based in Italy
1965 establishments in Italy
1965 disestablishments in Italy
Cycling teams established in 1965
Cycling teams disestablished in 1965